Nassaria termesoides is a species of sea snail, a marine gastropod mollusk in the family Nassariidae, the true whelks.

Description
The length of the shell attains 30.6 mm.

Distribution
This marine species occurs off Tanimbar Island, Indonesia.

References

 Fraussen K. 2006. Deep water Nassaria (Gastropoda: Buccinidae) from Banda and Arafura Seas. Novapex 7(2-3): 31-46

External links

Nassariidae
Gastropods described in 2006